Downtown Campbell is a Santa Clara Valley Transportation Authority (VTA) light rail station, located in downtown Campbell, California. Downtown Campbell station contains one island platform, and marks the beginning of a double-track section which continues to the end of line, Winchester station in western Campbell.  The station is served by the Green Line of the VTA Light Rail system.

Location
Downtown Campbell station is located at the intersection of Railway Avenue and Orchard City Drive. The station is located in the middle of Historic Downtown Campbell with many local shops, restaurants and services. Campbell Park is located about three blocks away, as is the Los Gatos Creek Trail trailhead.

History
The Downtown Campbell station was constructed as part of the Vasona Extension. It was dedicated August 12, 2005, but was not opened for revenue service until October 1, 2005, due to the delay in obtaining waiver from Federal Railroad Administration.

This site is where Campbell's first train station was located, the Campbell Depot. Originally built in 1866 as part of the South Pacific Coast Railroad connecting Oakland with Santa Cruz with narrow gauge service and breaking Southern Pacific's monopoly. The railroad and station were eventually acquired by Southern Pacific.

Platforms and tracks

The station's platform shelter is architecturally unique as compared with the other shelters used in the system.  The shelter features a brick facade and a roofline that blends more naturally with the surrounding buildings. This is one of the many VTA Light Rail stations that only fits 2 cars.

There is no public art currently on display at this station.

Connecting transit
VTA Bus: 26

References

Santa Clara Valley Transportation Authority light rail stations
Santa Clara Valley Transportation Authority bus stations
Railway stations in the United States opened in 2005
2005 establishments in California
Former Southern Pacific Railroad stations in California